Aaron West Arkeen (June 18, 1960 – May 30, 1997) was an American musician best known for co-writing several Guns N' Roses songs. He died in Los Angeles  of a drug overdose.

Early life
Aaron West Arkeen was born in Neuilly-sur-Seine, France and grew up in San Diego, California. He was the son  of Morris Arkeen, a retired U. S. Army Master Sergeant.  As an infant, he suffered from craniosynostosis, a birth defect in which the skull grows irregularly, often constricting brain growth. The condition required surgery that left an ear-to-ear scar over the crown of Arkeen's head. 
After his parents divorced in 1963 he was raised by his father with his older brother, Abe, in San Diego, California. His mother was a “non-factor” in the brothers’ lives and this was the root of West’s later substance-abuse issues. 

Arkeen began playing guitar when he was 14 years old. Though he took a single guitar lesson, he was largely a self-taught musician. Arkeen cited John Lennon, Led Zeppelin, Jimi Hendrix, Elton John, and Ted Nugent as musical influences from his youth.

He worked briefly in the oil industry in East Texas and as a slot machine repairman in Las Vegas, then moved from San Diego to Los Angeles to pursue a music career at age 23.  Arkeen’s longtime girlfriend Wendy Gosse described him seeing bands at local L. A. clubs and befriending them to jam and write songs, sometimes deep into the next day.

Music career
After several years of struggling to find success as a musician, Arkeen befriended a group of musicians in Los Angeles which would soon rise to international fame as Guns N' Roses. Arkeen lived in an apartment next to Guns N' Roses bassist Duff McKagan and 1960's funk pioneer Sly Stone, and he and McKagan quickly formed a friendship and began writing songs together. Though never a member of the band, the group's vocalist Axl Rose considered adding him as a third guitarist, primarily for his prolific songwriting abilities. Arkeen would ultimately leave his mark on the band by co-writing the songs "It's So Easy," "Crash Diet", "Bad Obsession", "The Garden", "Sentimental Movie" and "Yesterdays" with Rose. Arkeen also penned "Make Your Play" and "Pressure" for Birmingham, Alabama band Brother Cane, as well as co-writing "My Misery" for Phantom Blue.

After working on other songs with the band for their double set Use Your Illusion I and II, Arkeen started his own project in 1995, The Outpatience. Featuring vocalist Mike Shotton, bassist James Hunting, guitarist Joey Hunting, drummer Abe Laboriel Jr. and keyboardist Gregg Buchwalter, the band released their debut album, Anxious Disease in 1996 in Japan. The album has connections to Guns N' Roses: Axl Rose, Slash and Duff McKagan appear as guest artists and Izzy Stradlin co-wrote one of the songs.

Izzy Stradlin and Duff McKagan are most closely associated with Arkeen. The trio played in The Drunkfuxs' side project together, and Arkeen co-wrote two of the songs on McKagan's debut solo record, Believe in Me.

Death
On May 30, 1997, Arkeen was found dead in his Los Angeles home at 36 years old. Arkeen had been at home recovering from severe burns from his indoor barbeque that exploded. His death was ruled an "accidental opiate overdose."

Legacy and influence
Duff McKagan credits Arkeen with teaching him about alternate tuning on guitar. Slash stated that Arkeen was "the only one that always came through when any of us needed anything; for a long time he literally was the only one we could trust" Arkeen’s bluesy style affected GNR’s songwriting style.  The Guns N' Roses album Live Era: '87-'93 was dedicated, in part, to his memory.

Discography

References

External links
 West Arkeen @ Discogs.com

1960 births
20th-century American composers
Singer-songwriters from California
American male singer-songwriters
Guns N' Roses
1997 deaths
Drug-related deaths in California
People from Neuilly-sur-Seine
20th-century American singers
20th-century American male singers